Kulavilakku is a 1969 Indian Tamil-language drama film written and directed by K. S. Gopalakrishnan. A remake of the Malayalam film Adhyapika (1968), it stars B. Saroja Devi and Gemini Ganesan. The film was released on 14 June 1969.

Plot

Cast 
 B. Saroja Devi as Kannamma
 Gemini Ganesan
 S. V. Ranga Rao
 Nagesh
G. Sakunthala as the teacher
 Vijayasree
 V. K. Ramasamy
 Sachu
 Rajasulochana
 A. Karunanidhi
 Renuka

Production 
Kulavilakku is a remake of the 1968 Malayalam film Adhyapika. It was produced by K. S. Sabarinadhan under Amarjothi Movies, and directed by K. S. Gopalakrishnan who also wrote the screenplay. Cinematography was handled by Masthan.

Themes 
According to historian B. Vijayakumar, Kulavilakku follows a trope that was common in 1950s/1960s Indian cinema: "The heroine struggling and sacrificing her life for the people she loved, even though they were not related to her".

Soundtrack 
The music was composed by K. V. Mahadevan, with lyrics by Kannadasan.

Release and reception 
Kulavilakku was released on 14 June 1969. On the same day The Indian Express wrote, "The great asset of the film is the story [...] and the dialogue", and also praised the performance of the cast, particularly Saroja Devi.

References

External links 
 

1960s Tamil-language films
1969 drama films
Films directed by K. S. Gopalakrishnan
Films scored by K. V. Mahadevan
Films with screenplays by K. S. Gopalakrishnan
Indian drama films
Tamil remakes of Malayalam films